In mathematics, a unique factorization domain (UFD) (also sometimes called a factorial ring following the terminology of Bourbaki) is a ring in which a statement analogous to the fundamental theorem of arithmetic holds. Specifically, a UFD is an integral domain (a nontrivial commutative ring in which the product of any two non-zero elements is non-zero) in which every non-zero non-unit element can be written as a product of prime elements (or irreducible elements), uniquely up to order and units.

Important examples of UFDs are the integers and polynomial rings in one or more variables with coefficients coming from the integers or from a field.

Unique factorization domains appear in the following chain of class inclusions:

Definition 
Formally, a unique factorization domain is defined to be an integral domain R in which every non-zero element x of R can be written as a product (an empty product if x is a unit) of irreducible elements pi of R and a unit u:

x = u p1 p2 ⋅⋅⋅ pn with n ≥ 0

and this representation is unique in the following sense:
If q1, ..., qm are irreducible elements of R and w is a unit such that

x = w q1 q2 ⋅⋅⋅ qm with m ≥ 0,

then m = n, and there exists a bijective map φ : {1, ..., n} → {1, ..., m} such that pi is associated to qφ(i) for i ∈ {1, ..., n}.

The uniqueness part is usually hard to verify, which is why the following equivalent definition is useful:
A unique factorization domain is an integral domain R in which every non-zero element can be written as a product of a unit and prime elements of R.

Examples 

Most rings familiar from elementary mathematics are UFDs:

 All principal ideal domains, hence all Euclidean domains, are UFDs. In particular, the integers (also see fundamental theorem of arithmetic), the Gaussian integers and the Eisenstein integers are UFDs.
 If R is a UFD, then so is R[X], the ring of polynomials with coefficients in R. Unless R is a field, R[X] is not a principal ideal domain. By induction, a polynomial ring in any number of variables over any UFD (and in particular over a field or over the integers) is a UFD.
 The formal power series ring K[[X1,...,Xn]] over a field K (or more generally over a regular UFD such as a PID) is a UFD. On the other hand, the formal power series ring over a UFD need not be a UFD, even if the UFD is local. For example, if R is the localization of k[x,y,z]/(x2 + y3 + z7) at the prime ideal (x,y,z) then R is a local ring that is a UFD, but the formal power series ring R[[X]] over R is not a UFD.
The Auslander–Buchsbaum theorem states that every regular local ring is a UFD.
 is a UFD for all integers 1 ≤ n ≤ 22, but not for n = 23.
Mori showed that if the completion of a Zariski ring, such as a Noetherian local ring, is a UFD, then the ring is a UFD. The converse of this is not true: there are Noetherian local rings that are UFDs but whose completions are not. The question of when this happens is rather subtle: for example, for the localization of k[x,y,z]/(x2 + y3 + z5) at the prime ideal (x,y,z), both the local ring and its completion are UFDs, but in the apparently similar example of  the localization of k[x,y,z]/(x2 + y3 + z7) at the prime ideal (x,y,z) the local ring is a UFD but its completion is not.
Let  be a field of any characteristic other than 2. Klein and Nagata showed that the ring R[X1,...,Xn]/Q is a UFD whenever Q is a nonsingular quadratic form in the Xs and n is at least 5. When n=4 the ring need not be a UFD.
The ring Q[x,y]/(x2 + 2y2 + 1) is a UFD, but the ring Q(i)[x,y]/(x2 + 2y2 + 1) is not. Similarly the coordinate ring R[X,Y,Z]/(X2 + Y2 + Z2 − 1) of the 2-dimensional real sphere is a UFD, but the coordinate ring C'''[X,Y,Z]/(X2 + Y2 + Z2 − 1) of the complex sphere is not.
Suppose that the variables Xi are given weights wi, and F(X1,...,Xn) is a homogeneous polynomial of weight w. Then if c is coprime to w and R is a UFD and either every finitely generated projective module over R is free or c is 1 mod w, the ring R[X1,...,Xn,Z]/(Zc − F(X1,...,Xn)) is a UFD .

Non-examples
It is not hard to show that all four factors are irreducible as well, though this may not be obvious. See also algebraic integer.
 For a square-free positive integer d, the ring of integers of  will fail to be a UFD unless d is a Heegner number.
The ring of formal power series over the complex numbers is a UFD, but the subring of those that converge everywhere, in other words the ring of entire functions in a single complex variable, is not a UFD, since there exist entire functions with an infinity of zeros, and thus an infinity of irreducible factors, while a UFD factorization must be finite, e.g.:

 Properties 

Some concepts defined for integers can be generalized to UFDs:

 In UFDs, every irreducible element is prime. (In any integral domain, every prime element is irreducible, but the converse does not always hold.  For instance, the element  is irreducible, but not prime.) Note that this has a partial converse: a domain satisfying the ACCP is a UFD if and only if every irreducible element is prime.
 Any two elements of a UFD have a greatest common divisor and a least common multiple. Here, a greatest common divisor of a and b is an element d which divides both a and b, and such that every other common divisor of a and b divides d. All greatest common divisors of a and b are associated.
 Any UFD is integrally closed.  In other words, if R is a UFD with quotient field K, and if an element k in K is a root of a monic polynomial with coefficients in R, then k is an element of R.
 Let S be a multiplicatively closed subset of a UFD A. Then the localization  is a UFD. A partial converse to this also holds; see below.

 Equivalent conditions for a ring to be a UFD 
A Noetherian integral domain is a UFD if and only if every height 1 prime ideal is principal (a proof is given at the end). Also, a Dedekind domain is a UFD if and only if its ideal class group is trivial. In this case, it is in fact a principal ideal domain.

In general, for an integral domain A, the following conditions are equivalent:

 A is a UFD.
 Every nonzero prime ideal of A contains a prime element. (Kaplansky)
 A satisfies ascending chain condition on principal ideals (ACCP), and the localization S−1A is a UFD, where S is a multiplicatively closed subset of A generated by prime elements. (Nagata criterion)
 A satisfies ACCP and every irreducible is prime.
 A is atomic and every irreducible is prime.
 A is a GCD domain satisfying ACCP.
 A is a Schreier domain, and atomic.
 A is a pre-Schreier domain and atomic.
 A has a divisor theory in which every divisor is principal.
 A is a Krull domain in which every divisorial ideal is principal (in fact, this is the definition of UFD in Bourbaki.)
 A'' is a Krull domain and every prime ideal of height 1 is principal.

In practice, (2) and (3) are the most useful conditions to check. For example, it follows immediately from (2) that a PID is a UFD, since every prime ideal is generated by a prime element in a PID.

For another example, consider a Noetherian integral domain in which every height one prime ideal is principal. Since every prime ideal has finite height, it contains a height one prime ideal (induction on height) which is principal. By (2), the ring is a UFD.

See also

Parafactorial local ring
Noncommutative unique factorization domain

Citations

References

 
   Chap. 4.
 Chapter II.5 of 
 

 

Ring theory
Algebraic number theory
factorization